Betty Miller (née Spiro; 1910 – 24 November 1965) was an Irish author of both literary fiction and non-fiction.

Biography

Betty Spiro was born in Cork, Ireland, the daughter of Sara (Bergson) and Simon Spiro, who were Lithuanian Jews.

She wrote her first novel, The Mere Living (1933), while studying journalism at University College, London. Her literary reputation was established by the publication of her biography of Robert Browning (1952), which earned her election to the Royal Society of Literature. 

After the Second World War she wrote extensively for literary journals including Horizon, The Cornhill Magazine and The Twentieth Century. Of her seven novels, two are still in print: Farewell, Leicester Square (1941), published by Persephone Books in 2000, and On the Side of the Angels (1945), published by Capuchin Classics in 2012.

Personal life
In 1933, she married Emanuel Miller (1892–1970), the founding father of British child psychiatry. The couple had two children: Sarah (died 2006), and Sir Jonathan Miller (1934–2019), the theatre and opera director.

Bibliography 
 The Mere Living (1933)
 Sunday (1934)
 Portrait of the Bride (1935)
 Farewell Leicester Square (1941)
 A Room in Regent's Park (1942)
 On the Side of the Angels (1945)
 The Death of a Nightingale (1948)
 Robert Browning: A Portrait (1952)

References 

1910 births
1965 deaths
Jewish novelists
Jewish women writers
Irish biographers
Irish Jews
Women biographers
Irish women novelists
20th-century Irish women writers
20th-century Irish novelists
20th-century biographers
People from Cork (city)
Alumni of University College London
People educated at Notting Hill & Ealing High School